Patrick Arnold Shriver Schwarzenegger (born September 18, 1993) is an Austrian-American model, actor, investor, and entrepreneur. He is a son of Arnold Schwarzenegger and Maria Shriver.

Early life and family
Schwarzenegger was born at Providence St John’s Health Center in Santa Monica, California and raised in Los Angeles, California. He is the eldest son of Maria Shriver, a journalist and author who is a member of the Kennedy family, and Arnold Schwarzenegger, an Austrian-born bodybuilder, actor, and former Governor of California. Schwarzenegger has two elder sisters, Katherine and Christina, a younger brother, Christopher, and a younger paternal half-brother, Joseph. His maternal grandparents were activist Eunice Kennedy Shriver and diplomat and politician Sargent Shriver.

Schwarzenegger holds dual Austrian-American citizenship, speaks English and German, regularly visits Austria and maintains a strong connection to his father's native country. His cousin, also named Patrick Schwarzenegger, lost his father (Arnold's brother) in a car accident in 1971 and is now an attorney.

Acting career

At the age of ten, Schwarzenegger had a small role in the film The Benchwarmers. Throughout his childhood, he practiced acting with his father, and through his young adult years, he studied theater at USC while taking acting classes weekly at Nancy Banks Studio. At age 15 he started a clothing line.

Patrick is also signed with LA Models, which had plans to push him for Ralph Lauren and Armani ad campaigns. He has stated that he hopes to raise awareness of his clothing company by taking on high-profile modeling jobs.

Schwarzenegger had supporting roles in 2012's Stuck in Love, 2013's Grown Ups 2 and 2015's Scouts Guide to the Zombie Apocalypse. His first leading role was opposite Bella Thorne in 2018's Midnight Sun, a romantic drama about a teenage girl with a rare medical condition, which went on to gross over 27 million dollars worldwide. His performance in the 2019 horror Daniel Isn't Real was praised as "excellent" and played with "a playful intensity similar to his father" and "a restraint unusual in actors his age". In 2020, Schwarzenegger worked opposite Academy Award winner Michael Shannon in Echo Boomers, then in 2021, went to star in Netflix's comedy-drama coming-of-age film Moxie.

Personal life
While studying at Brentwood High School, Schwarzenegger took private acting lessons with Nancy Banks. In 2012, he matriculated at the University of Southern California, and graduated from the USC Marshall School of Business with a minor in Cinematic Arts in May 2016. He was part of the Lambda Chi Alpha fraternity.

Filmography

Film

Television

Music videos

See also
 Kennedy family tree

References

External links

1993 births
21st-century American male actors
American fashion businesspeople
American male child actors
American male film actors
American male models
American male television actors
American people of Austrian descent
American people of Czech descent
American people of German descent
American people of Irish descent
American philanthropists
American restaurateurs
Austrian male film actors
Brentwood School (Los Angeles) alumni
Businesspeople from Los Angeles
Kennedy family
Living people
Male actors from California
Male actors from Los Angeles
Male actors from Santa Monica, California
Male models from California
Marshall School of Business alumni
People from Los Angeles
Schwarzenegger family
Shriver family